Matter+Form is the fifth studio album by the German-based alternative electronic band VNV Nation, released in 2005. It was co-engineered by German trance DJ Humate (Gerret Frerichs), and Andre Winter. "Chrome" was released as a one-track single.

It charted at no. 38 in the mainstream German charts, charting for 2 weeks and peaked at #1 on the German Alternative Charts (DAC), ranking #6 on the DAC Top 50 Albums of 2005.

Track listing

References

2005 albums
VNV Nation albums